The 1901 eastern United States heat wave was the most severe and deadly heat wave in the United States prior to the 1930s Dust Bowl. Although the heat wave did not set many still-standing daily temperature records, it was exceptionally prolonged – covering without interruption the second half of June and all of July – and centered upon more highly populated areas than later American heat waves.

June
In spite of frequent nor'easters leading to record heavy rainfall over East Coast states from Massachusetts to South Carolina during April and May, drought had already been developing over the interior. However, only over the sparsely populated far-northern Great Plains was the spring unusually hot.

It intensified and spread from June 25, when Philadelphia began twelve consecutive days above  – a record it did not surpass until 1953. As the heat wave spread to New York City – in an era without sanitation or air conditioning – it had by the close of June begun to severely disrupt life.

July
July 1901 was the hottest month over the contiguous United States until the 1930s, and is currently surpassed only by the Julys of 1931, 1934, 1936 and 2012. It remains the hottest month on record in Kentucky and West Virginia, and throughout the eastern half, heat was extremely persistent without any cool interval – although a violent tornado hit Inwood on the northern tip of Manhattan with heavy rainfall on the fifth.

With the persistent heat, most horses collapsed, and their carcasses became a source of germs that greatly added to the already high mortality rate in major cities. In one day alone, 250 horses died in New York City, and by the end of July's first week, public streetcars had ceased to run because horses could not be fed. Most factories were closed by the beginning of the month, and those which continued to operate had to permit their workers to wear light gymnastic costumes, as these were the only cooler alternative to the three-piece suits considered polite dress at the time.

As the heat failed to relent over the Ohio Valley and Middle Atlantic states, it spread to the established summer resort of Marquette, Michigan, during the middle of July. On the 14th, Marquette – after staying below  on all but five days of the heat wave's first month – recorded , which was  hotter than ever experienced there before and  hotter than any temperature recorded since. Then, a week later, without a cool break, the heat intensified further between July 21 and 25, when most of the maximum temperatures of the year were recorded. On the 22nd, Louisville reached ; Chicago,  with a  minimum; and Indianapolis,  with a  minimum. Farm work was abandoned, and the poorer sections of the population had to rely on canned vegetables for food due to the scarcity of fresh produce.

Aftermath
The heat wave gradually eased at the beginning of August, with temperatures in the Ohio Valley falling to more seasonal levels on August 5, for the first time in over fifty days. Although August was an extremely wet month in the Deep South and along the Atlantic Coast, it was exceptionally dry west and north of the Ohio River.

In the most extensive study of American heat waves, it was estimated that the 1901 Eastern heat wave claimed the lives of 9,500 people, which makes it easily the most destructive disaster of its type in US history.

References

 
1901 meteorology
1901 eastern United States heat wave
1901 natural disasters in the United States
June 1901 events
July 1901 events